Saint Petersburg is the second-largest city in Russia and its capital in the 18-20th centuries.

Saint Petersburg may also refer to:

Places 
 St. Petersburg, Florida, a city in Florida, United States
 Saint Petersburg, Colorado, an unincorporated community in Colorado, United States
 St. Petersburg, Pennsylvania, a borough in Pennsylvania, United States
 Petersburg, Alaska, sometimes referred to as St. Petersburg, a settlement in Alaska, United States
 Bourg-Saint-Pierre, Switzerland, also known by its obsolete German name St. Petersburg
 St. Petersburg, Missouri, the fictional hometown of Mark Twain's characters Tom Sawyer and Huckleberry Finn

Arts 
 St. Petersburg (tune), a tune by composer Dmitry Bortniansky (1751–1825)
 "St. Petersburg" (song), 2005 song by the band Supergrass
 Saint Petersburg (film), a 2010 film

Other uses
 St. Petersburg paradox, in probability theory and decision theory
 St. Petersburg College, St. Petersburg, Florida, United States
 Saint Petersburg (board game), 2004 designer board game
 MV City of St. Petersburg, a roll-on/roll-off, car carrier cargo ship

See also 

Saint Petersburg Beach, Florida, USA
Petersburg (disambiguation)
Convention of St Petersburg (disambiguation)
Saint Petersburg Declaration (disambiguation)
Treaty of Saint Petersburg (disambiguation)

Petrograd (disambiguation)
Leningrad (disambiguation)